The Cathedral of St. Joseph the Workman is the mother church of the Diocese of La Crosse. The cathedral, designed by architect Edward J. Schulte, was completed in 1962. Built of limestone, it has a tall clock tower which rises above the surrounding buildings in downtown La Crosse, Wisconsin.

In 2008, the cathedral undertook a six-week project to repair the steeple.  In March 2021, the cathedral began another program to repair the steeple which began to drop stones in summer 2020.  The renovations will address several problem areas of the structure and are expected to be complete by year's end.

The following Bishops of the Diocese of La Crosse are buried in the Blessed Sacrament Chapel:
Kilian Caspar Flasch
James Schwebach
Alexander Joseph McGavick, founder of Aquinas High School-La Crosse, Wisconsin
John Patrick Treacy, the builder of the new cathedral
Frederick William Freking
John Joseph Paul
Note:Bishop Michael Heiss is buried in Milwaukee and Auxiliary Bishop William Richard Griffin is buried in Chicago.

Gallery

See also

List of Catholic cathedrals in the United States
List of cathedrals in the United States

Notes

External links

Official Cathedral Site
Roman Catholic Diocese of La Crosse Official Site
 

Churches in the Roman Catholic Diocese of La Crosse
Buildings and structures in La Crosse, Wisconsin
Roman Catholic cathedrals in Wisconsin
Religious organizations established in 1863
Roman Catholic churches completed in 1962
Churches in La Crosse County, Wisconsin
20th-century Roman Catholic church buildings in the United States